B96  may refer to:
 Bundesstraße 96, a German road
 Sicilian Defence, Najdorf Variation, according to the list of chess openings
 B96, a postcode district in the B postcode area
 B96, a defunct Minnesota radio station, now part of KMWA
 WBBM-FM, B96 Chicago

B-96 may refer to:
 WGZB-FM, B-96 Louisville
 B-96 (Michigan county highway)